The Zeesen short-wave transmitter was a 70-metre-high shortwave radio transmission mast constructed at Zeesen in Germany in 1931. Consisting of a lattice tower of pitch pine timbers, it was one of Germany's first short-wave broadcasting transmitters. It was equipped with four transmitting arms, at 90-degree separation, surmounted by two omnidirectional aerials. In 1939, the wooden tower was replaced by a 70-metre high steel mast with a single omnidirectional aerial. This mast was dismantled, together with all the Zeesen transmitters, in 1945.

See also
 Deutschlandsender Zeesen

External links
 http://skyscraperpage.com/diagrams/?b60839

Towers completed in 1931
1931 establishments in Germany
Radio masts and towers in Germany
1945 disestablishments in Germany
Buildings and structures in Dahme-Spreewald
Buildings and structures demolished in 1945
History of telecommunications in Germany